Niemeyer, Niemeier, or Niemeijer is a surname. Notable people with the surname include:

Anna Maria Niemeyer (1929–2012), Brazilian architect, furniture designer, daughter of Oscar
August Hermann Niemeyer (1754–1828), German Protestant theologian and poet
Brian Niemeier, American science fiction horror author
Carol A. Niemeier (born 1934), American politician
Deb Niemeier, American civil engineer
Felix von Niemeyer (1820–1871), German physician
Frédéric Niemeyer (born 1976), Canadian tennis player
Hans-Volker Niemeier, German mathematician
Hermann Niemeyer Fernández (1918-1991), Chilean biochemist
Isidora Niemeyer (born 2001), Chilean rower
 (1870–1937), Dutch member of parliament
Jo Niemeyer (born 1946), German artist and designer
Jule Niemeier (born 1999), German tennis player
 (1902–1987), Dutch chess problemist
Mitchell Niemeyer (born 1988), Dutch  DJ and house music Producer
Oscar Niemeyer (1907–2012), Brazilian architect
Otto Niemeyer (1883–1971), English financial official and creator of the "Niemeyer statement"
Paul Niemeyer (doctor) (1832–1890), German physician
Paul V. Niemeyer (born 1941), American federal appellate judge
Peter Niemeyer (born 1983), German football player
Reuven Niemeijer (born 1995), Dutch footballer
 (born 1947), German archaeologist
 (born 1949), German scholar of geodesy

See also
Niemeyer (tobacco), Dutch tobacco company
9246 Niemeyer, main-belt asteroid named after Oscar Niemeyer
Niemeyer-Dolan technique, in lithography
Neumayer

German-language surnames

de:Niemeyer